"SoSA" is the informal name of a small, inner-city neighborhood near downtown Oklahoma City. A website of the same name was developed by the architect and former resident who coined the term. SoSA is an acronym for "South of Saint Anthony", a reference to nearby St. Anthony Hospital. The name has not been accepted by a majority of the residents as an official designation, nor does the City of Oklahoma City use the term. Officially referred to as the "Cottage District" due to the number of quaint, old-fashioned homes in the area, SoSA is the name for the district used primarily by non-residents and real-estate agents.

The portion of Midtown sometimes referred to as SoSA is a residential neighborhood known for its unique mix of architecture. It is a small, eclectic inner city neighborhood characterized by a mix of early 1900s era cottages, blight, and striking contemporary architecture.  Situated on the Northwest corner of the central business district, SoSA is roughly bordered by Classen Boulevard, Walker Street, NW 6th Street, and NW 10th Street.  The City of Oklahoma City maintains a design review commission called the "Urban Design Commission" that is charged with applying the City's statutory design guidelines.  

After the post World War II exodus of population to the suburbs, this neighborhood followed the general decline of downtown and developed an unsavory reputation. The neighborhood still has pockets of blight, but a transformation began in 2002 with the rehabilitation of two 1906 residential buildings. As of 2010 there are seven architect-designed residences within a two block radius, with two more projects currently being designed. The high density of architect-occupied, contemporary dwellings has caused it to be called "the architect's ghetto."  

As of April, 2015, a total of twelve new, architect designed residential structures have been completed along with a smaller number of significant total renovations. Most of these projects are in a contemporary architectural design style and include single family residences, a duplex and one small living space added atop a commercial business location.  A seven unit multi-family, row house project and the total renovation of an early 1900s eight-plex are nearing completion as are two more modern single family residences. Two more modern style homes are in the early construction phase and several more are on the drawing boards.   

SoSA's proximity to downtown and location within Oklahoma City's Midtown district, combined with its innovative architecture, eclectic character, and dramatic skyline views, make it a unique and vibrant inner-city district.

See also
Neighborhoods of Oklahoma City

References

OKC Central Blog - Oklahoman Newspaper
Oklahoma City Planning Department

External links
SoSA

Neighborhoods in Oklahoma City